Kafar who disobey God :
Kafar may refer to:
Kafar, Iran, a village in North Khorasan Province
 Kafar, Łódź Voivodeship, Poland